WNXX is a radio station in Jackson, Louisiana and serves the Baton Rouge area. WNXX airs a sports format with programming from ESPN Radio.  Along with four other sister stations, its studios are housed at the Guaranty Group building on Government Street east of downtown, and its transmitter is located near Slaughter, Louisiana.

External links

Sports radio stations in the United States
Radio stations in Louisiana
Radio stations established in 1999
1999 establishments in Louisiana